The New Ulm Steel are a Tier III junior ice hockey team based in New Ulm, Minnesota. They are members of the West Division of the North American 3 Hockey League (NA3HL).

History
Founded in 2011 when the North American 3 Hockey League (NA3HL) announced its expansion from 12 teams to 16. The Twin City Steel were to be based in the new White Bear Lake Sports Center in White Bear Lake, Minnesota, starting for the 2011–12 season alongside the other three other new NA3HL teams: the Minnesota Junior Hockey League transfers, Granite City Lumberjacks and Minnesota Flying Aces, and an expansion team, the North Iowa Bulls. The Twin City Steel played their first season out of the new Vadnais Sports Center, situated in the Twin Cities, which includes the suburbs of White Bear Lake, North St. Paul, Forest Lake, Roseville and Moundsview. The Twin City Steel lost their first game, 4–3, at the Granite City Lumberjacks on September 10, 2011, and would record their first win less than a week later at their home-opener.

It was announced on April 23, 2013, that the Steel have been sold by Scott Wallin to the Black family.

After a successful 30–13–4 record during the 2015–16 regular season, the Steel would go on to win their first West Division Championship by sweeping the defending league champions, Granite City Lumberjacks. The Steel then made their first NA3HL Silver Cup Playoff appearance but would lose in overtime to the eventual Silver Cup Champion North Iowa Bulls.

On April 26, 2016, it was announced that the Twin City Steel would be relocating to New Ulm, Minnesota, to become the New Ulm Steel. In 2018, Steve Black also purchased a team in the Tier II North American Hockey League (NAHL) and relocated it as the Chippewa Steel. In March 2021, Steve Black sold both Steel teams to an ownership group led by Kelly Kasik.

Season-by-season records

References

External links 
 New Ulm Steel
 North American 3 Hockey League website

Ice hockey teams in Minnesota
2016 establishments in Minnesota
Ice hockey clubs established in 2016
New Ulm, Minnesota